Albert II may refer to:

Monkeys 
 Albert II (monkey), first primate and first mammal in space, died on impact following V-2 flight June 14, 1949

People
 Albert II, Count of Namur (died 1067)
 Albert II, Count of Tyrol (died 1120s)
 Albert II, Margrave of Brandenburg (–1220)
 Albert II, Archbishop of Riga (1200–1273)
 Albert II, Margrave of Meissen (1240–1314),
 Albert II, Duke of Saxony (1250–1298)
 Albert II, Duke of Brunswick-Lüneburg (–1318)
 Albert II of Austria (1298–1358)
 Albert II, Prince of Anhalt-Zerbst (died 1362)
 Albert II, Duke of Mecklenburg (1318–1379)
 Albert II, Duke of Bavaria-Straubing (1368–1397)
 Albert II, Count of Holstein-Rendsburg (1369–1403)
 Albert II of Germany (1397–1439), King of Germany, Hungary, Croatia and Bohemia, Duke of Austria
 Albert II, Duke of Brunswick-Grubenhagen (1419–1485)
 Albert II, Duke of Mecklenburg-Stargard (1400s)
 Albert II, Count of Hoya (1526–1563)
 Albert II, Margrave of Brandenburg-Ansbach (1620–1667)
 Albert II of Belgium (born 1934), King of the Belgians
 Albert II, Prince of Monaco (born 1958), ruler of the principality of Monaco
 Albert II, Prince of Thurn and Taxis (born 1983), Prince of Thurn und Taxis, German prince